Vera Frances Ward ( Still, born 29 September 1930) is a British actress who worked with Arthur Askey, Tommy Handley, George Formby, Dinah Sheridan, John Mills and Alastair Sim, amongst others.

Frances's father was a props and special effects man for Gainsborough Pictures at Grove Studio's in Shepherd's Bush. She made her first film appearance in Back-Room Boy as the Cockney girl Jane. she then went on to make another five films.

In her late teens Frances left film to follow her ambition to be a dance teacher. This proved to be very successful and resulted in a dance school. After marrying Dennis William Ward in 1953, Frances moved the school to March, Cambridgeshire. Dennis died in Cambridge in 2000, at the age of 73. In a February 2008 interview, Frances stated that she stopped making films because there were limited opportunities available for her when transitioning from a child actress.

Filmography
Back-Room Boy (1942) .... Jane
King Arthur Was a Gentleman (1942) .... Vera
It's That Man Again (1943) .... Daisy
Get Cracking (1943) .... Irene
Waterloo Road (1945) .... Vera Colter 
Good-Time Girl (1948) .... Edie

References

External links
 Vera Frances on Britmovie.net

1930 births
Living people
English child actresses
English film actresses
People from Dagenham
People from March, Cambridgeshire